Cisco Press is a publishing alliance between Cisco Systems and Pearson, the world's largest education publishing and technology company which is part of Pearson PLC, the global publisher and co-owner (47%) of Penguin Group and formerly Financial Times.  Cisco Press distributes its titles through traditional resellers as well as through the O’Reilly Online Learning e-reference service. Cisco Press is the Cisco Systems authorized book publisher of Cisco networking technology, Cisco certification self-study, and Cisco Networking Academy Program materials. Leading authorities from Cisco Systems and other industry innovators write and contribute to the various titles and series that make up the Cisco Press product family. Products from Cisco Press are part of a recommended learning path from Cisco Systems that combines instructor-led training with hands-on instruction, e-learning, and self-study.

External links

Book publishing companies based in Indiana
Pearson plc
Publishing companies established in 1996